The 2008 Women's FA Community Shield was the eighth Women's FA Community Shield, as with its male equivalent, the Community Shield is an annual football match played between the winners of the previous season's league and the previous season's Women's FA Cup. The final was contested between Arsenal and Everton. Kelly Smith scored the winner for Arsenal.

References

Women's FA Community Shield
Community Shield
Community Shield
Community Shield
Community Shield